The TCA Award for Outstanding Achievement in Sports was an award given by the Television Critics Association from 1985 to 1997.

Winners and nominees

References

External links
Official website

Sports